Feghali or Feghaly is an Arabic surname. It may refer to:

Bassem Feghali, Lebanese comedian, singer and drag queen
Imad Feghaly, Lebanese actor and voice actor
Jeanette Feghali better known as Sabah (1927–2014), Lebanese singer and actress
José Feghali (1961–2014), Brazilian pianist
Roger Feghali (born 1973), Lebanese rally driver